Storm Over the Andes (aka Alas sobre El Chaco) is a 1935 American adventure film directed by Christy Cabanne and starring Jack Holt, Antonio Moreno and Mona Barrie. The low-budget programmer is set against the backdrop of the Chaco War between Paraguay and Bolivia. A separate Spanish-language version, titled Alas Sobre El Chaco, also directed by Cabanne, was made.

Plot
Cynical pilot Captain Robert Kent (Jack Holt has been hired on as a mercenary for Bolivia in their war with Paraguay. Major Manuel Tovar (Antonio Moreno) in charge of the men at Entre Rios where Kent is assigned, grounds Kent for dangerous flying. Kent also makes an enemy of Mitchell (Grant Withers), another flyer, when he flirts with Mitchell's girl Juanita (Anita Camargo), giving her a distinctive snake ring, one of many he has cynically given out. Tovar says nothing is more wonderful than giving your love to one woman forever.

When Paraguayan bombers fly over Entre Rios, everyone except Kent prepares to attack. Determined to fly, Kent knocks out Mitchell and takes his place. Kent is slightly wounded in the attack, and he is sent to the hospital in La Paz to recuperate. Tovar forgives him for disobeying orders. Against his nurse's orders, Kent leaves the hospital to take part in a fiesta, where he meets a beautiful and mysterious woman named Teresa (Mona Barrie). He gives her one of his snake rings. This time, Kent has fallen in love, he tries to take back the ring, but Teresa begs to keep it as a memento. She slips off before he can learn where she lives.

The next day, Tovar arrives in La Paz to celebrate his wedding anniversary and bring Kent back to Entre Rios. Kent learns that Teresa is Tovar's wife. Tovar finds the snake ring that Kent gave Teresa, then overhears the two of them talking on the balcony and assumes that they had an affair. Tovar refuses to listen to Teresa's explanations

Flying back to the front, Tovar tries to kill himself and Kent diving their aircraft toward earth before Kent wrestles the controls away from him. After landing, Kent tries to convince Tovar that nothing happened between him and Teresa. Remaining unconvinced, Tovar flies a suicide mission and is shot down behind enemy lines.

Teresa flies to Entre Rios to try to save her marriage and begs Kent to rescue her husband. Kent parachutes into the jungle and brings Tovar to safety. At a Paraguayan airstrip, they see flying ace El Zorro (José Rubio) who is called "the fox who flies like an eagle". Catching El Zorro warming up his bomber, the pair take control. Tovar bombs the Paraguayan ammunition warehouse, but when the warehouse is destroyed, and they turn the aircraft toward home, Mitchell, who has vowed to destroy El Zorro, attacks. Not knowing his own men are inside the aircraft, Mitchell wounds Kent in the attack.

Tovar and Teresa, now reconciled, rush Kent to a hospital in La Paz where it appears that he will recover.

Cast

 Jack Holt as Bob Kent  
 Antonio Moreno as Maj. Tovar Rojas  
 Mona Barrie as Theresa  
 Gene Lockhart as Cracker 
 Grant Withers as Mitchell  
 Barry Norton as Diaz  
 George J. Lewis as Garcia 
 Juanita Garfias as Pepita  
 Luis Díaz Flores as Silvera  
 Juan Torena as Milano  
 Hans Heinrich von Twardowski as Oberto
 José A. Caraballo as Cabello 
 Francisco Moreno as Leon  
 Alma Real as Nurse  
 Francisco Mará as General 
 Anita Camargo as Juanita  
 José Rubio as El Zorro  
 Max Wagner as Sentry 
 Carlos Albert as Dancer  
 Greta Albert as Dancer  
 Ted Billings as Little Man   
 Hector De Saa as Mechanic  
 Juan Duval as Assistant  
 Charles Fallon as Cafe Proprietor  
 Eugenia Fause as Waitress  
 June Gittelson as Big Woman  
 Ruth Gonzales as Barmaid  
 Isabel La Mal as Mrs. Livingston  
 Victor Lewisas Officer  
 Alberto Morin as Intern 
 Alfonso Pedroza as El Diablo 
 Lucio Villegas as Doctor

Production
Principal photography on Storm Over the Andes took place from June 9 to July 19, 1935.

Stunt pilot Garland Lincoln was hired by Universal Pictures to fly in Storm Over the Andes, using Lincoln's hangar at the Metropolitan Airport, which served as the Bolivian air base. He also provided a number of aircraft for the film including his Garland-Lincoln LF-1.

Spanish-language version
The Spanish-language version, titled Alas sobre El Chaco (en: Wings Over the Chaco), was also directed by Cabanne, and stars José Crespo, Lupita Tovar and Antonio Moreno. Alas sobre El Chaco was released in November 1935.

Reception
Aviation film historian James H. Farmer in Celluloid Wings: The Impact of Movies on Aviation (1984) described Storm Over the Andes as an "above-average Jack Holt air adventure." Reviewer Hal Erickson noted, "For a man who was reportedly deathly afraid of flying, Jack Holt certainly made more than his share of aviation pictures."

References

Notes

Citations

Bibliography

 Farmer, James H. Celluloid Wings: The Impact of Movies on Aviation. Blue Ridge Summit, Pennsylvania: Tab Books Inc., 1984. .
 Jarvinen, Lisa. The Rise of Spanish-language Filmmaking: Out from Hollywood's Shadow, 1929-1939. New Brunswick, New Jersey: Rutger's University Press, 2012. .
 Pendo, Stephen. Aviation in the Cinema. Lanham, Maryland: Scarecrow Press, 1985. .
 Wynne, H. Hugh. The Motion Picture Stunt Pilots and Hollywood's Classic Aviation Movies. Missoula, Montana: Pictorial Histories Publishing Co., 1987. .

External links
 
 

1935 films
1935 adventure films
American adventure films
Films directed by Christy Cabanne
Universal Pictures films
Films set in South America
Films shot in California
American multilingual films
American black-and-white films
Films scored by Heinz Roemheld
1935 multilingual films
American aviation films
1930s English-language films
1930s American films